Gamasiphoides is a genus of mites in the family Ologamasidae. There are more than 20 described species in Gamasiphoides.

Species
These 22 species belong to the genus Gamasiphoides:

 Gamasiphoides acanthioides Karg & Schorlemmer, 2011
 Gamasiphoides aitkeni Lee, 1970
 Gamasiphoides baloghi Karg, 1976
 Gamasiphoides brevisetis Karg, 1976
 Gamasiphoides caudatae Karg, 1996
 Gamasiphoides coniunctus Karg, 1976
 Gamasiphoides costai Lee & Hunter, 1974
 Gamasiphoides femoralis (Banks, 1916)
 Gamasiphoides gamasiphioides (Sheals, 1962)
 Gamasiphoides leptogenitalis Karg, 1993
 Gamasiphoides linealis Karg, 1976
 Gamasiphoides longocuspis Karg, 1976
 Gamasiphoides longosetis Karg, 1976
 Gamasiphoides longoventris Karg, 1976
 Gamasiphoides lootsi Halliday, 2005
 Gamasiphoides macquariensis (Hirschmann, 1966)
 Gamasiphoides octosetae Karg, 1976
 Gamasiphoides postanalis Karg, 1993
 Gamasiphoides procerus Karg & Schorlemmer, 2011
 Gamasiphoides propinquus (Womersley, 1956)
 Gamasiphoides rykei Halliday, 2005
 Gamasiphoides setosus Karg, 1976

References

Ologamasidae